Juan Pajadora Pala Jr. (July 17, 1954 – September 6, 2003), more widely known as Jun Porras Pala, was a Filipino journalist, columnist and pundit who worked for DXGO. Pala was mostly known for his extensive work exposing corrupt politicians from the southeastern Davao City, Davao Region, Philippines. Pala was the target of three assassination attempts before he was killed on September 6, 2003.

In 2016, testimony was introduced in the Philippines by a former hitman that allegedly linked President Rodrigo Duterte to the death squads that carried out Pala's murder while Duterte was the mayor of Davao City. The office of the president denied the allegations.

Career
In the 1980s, Juan Pala's professional career began when he became the main spokesperson for a Filipino vigilante group called the Alsa Masa. The vigilante group is best known for hunting down and killing Communist and corrupt politicians, and has also been blamed for human rights violations. Pala was visible as the spokesperson for the group once he established his own radio show. After the city of Davao started listening to what Pala had to say, he started to gain public support. This led Pala to form his own anti-communist group named Contra Force. By the late 1990s, Pala leveraged his popularity by seeking office as a city counselor and was elected in 1998. Pala's career was not without controversy. Pala was met with a libel case and was suspended from his radio station for six months. After the six-month suspension Pala was banned for life by the Association of Broadcasters in the Philippines for using inflammatory language while on air. With the aid of unknown influential person and on the basis of his popularity, he was able to have the ban lifted. Through all of the controversy and political pressure, Juan's family stated he never wavered from trying to make the city of Davao better. Juan's wife Louise stated that her husband aired critical commentaries against various government officials, including Mayor Rodrigo Duterte and President Gloria Macapagal Arroyo. He had also exposed graft and corruption in the city involving some politicians.

Death 
The first attempt on Pala's life occurred on June 14, 2001. Pala was taking a taxi home from work when gun shots ripped through the taxi, grazing him in the neck. Soon after the first attack on his life, Pala and his family hired the services of bodyguards to protect them from future attacks. This near death experience did not stop Pala from his work. Pala received death threats at the radio station. He was attacked again on April 29, 2003. According to Pala's wife Louise, the death threats forced her husband to record his radio program from home via the telephone. Even though this was the safer option for Pala, he still preferred conducting his radio show from the studio.

The attack on September 6, 2003, was fatal. Juan Pala, 49-years old at the time of his murder, was gunned down by two men on a motorcycle while walking home from work one day. The night of his death, Pala was accompanied by his brother and two bodyguards. Juan's brother sustained minor injuries, and one of the bodyguards was hit while trying to take down one of the gunmen from the attack. In all Pala was shot four times in the chest from the attack and he died instantly from his wounds.

Context 
Juan Pala grew up in the Igpit Tres de Mayo Digos Davao del Sur. The city of Davao acts as a main trade, commerce, and industry hub of the Philippines and is located in the center of Davao Region. In March 2003, the year in which Pala was attacked for the third time and later killed, the city of Davao experienced economic uncertainty as it reeled from an attack on its airport that killed 21 people and injured over 150 people. The region around Davao, such Mindanao, was a threat to the city's long-term economic stability. Mayor Duterte promised a strong law and order response at the time to the bombing.

Impact 
Pala's career was first established when he became the spokesperson for the Alsa Masa around 1987. But he became most known for hosting his radio program "Tell Pala" on DXGO radio located in the heart of Davao, a show dedicated to protecting the people of Davao from corrupt politicians. Later, he was elected to city council. The violent attempts on his life and murder were issues raised later in the presidential election in 2016 when the opposition against President Duterte, revealed testimony that allegedly linked Duterte to the 'death squad' as revealed by a hitman who killed Pala.

Reactions 

 Nelly Castillo, one of Pala's colleagues, said, "Sometimes he would admit that he was corrupt and that he received money from his friends. But what made him popular was that he was not afraid to speak out."
 Juan's wife Louise said, "My husband aired critical commentaries against various government officials, including Mayor Rodrigo Duterte and President Gloria Macapagal Arroyo. He had also exposed graft and corruption in the city involving some politicians.
 Chito D. Herbolingo: "Juan Pala is gone now, but his name will forever be etched in every Davao household and in every Dabawenyo’s heart and mind. He may be notorious for those who hated him, but is grossly revered by those who loved him. Your lasting tribute to society is our salute to your service to God, country and people will forever run eternal. Farewell, my friend."

See also
 Communist rebellion in the Philippines
 DXUM
 List of journalists killed under the Arroyo administration
 List of wars 1945–89

References 

1950s births
Filipino anti-communists
2003 deaths
Deaths by firearm in the Philippines
Assassinated Filipino journalists
Journalists killed in the Philippines
People from Davao City
Filipino radio journalists